Crystal Theater and Crystal Theatre may refer to:

in England
Crystal Theatre (Bristol, England), a theater that is home to one of Bristol's record labels

in the United States

Crystal Theatre (Los Angeles, California) at 247 S. Main Street, remodeled as a bar and club
Crystal Theater (Dublin, Georgia), now home to the restaurant Deano's
Crystal Theater (Crystal Falls, Michigan)
Crystal Theatre (Elko, Nevada) on Commercial Street in Elko, Nevada
Crystal Theatre (Okemah, Oklahoma)
Crystal Theatre (Flandreau, South Dakota)
Crystal Theatre (Gonzales, Texas)

See also
Dixie Crystal Theatre, Clewiston, Florida